The Chelsea bun is a type of currant bun that was first baked in the 18th century at the Bun House in Chelsea, an establishment favoured by Hanoverian royalty accustomed to similar pastries in their native cuisine. The shop was demolished in 1839.

The bun is made of a rich yeast dough flavoured with lemon peel, cinnamon or mixed spice. The dough is rolled out, spread with a mixture of currants, brown sugar and butter, then formed into a square-sided log. The process of making this bun is very similar to that involved in producing the cinnamon roll. After being baked, traditionally the chelsea bun is glazed with syrup (or cold water and sugar). It is glazed while still hot so that the water evaporates and leaves a sticky sugar coating. Commercially made buns are sometimes topped with glace icing.

See also
 List of British breads
 List of buns
 List of sweet breads
 Mohnstrudel, a similar European bread filled with poppy seeds or chopped nuts

References

External links
A traditional Chelsea Bun recipe 
 How to make Chelsea buns

British breads
British cakes
Sweet breads
Yeast breads
Buns